The Iron and Steel Institute was an English association organized by the iron trade of the north of England. Its object was the discussion of practical and scientific questions connected with the manufacture of iron and steel.

History
The first meeting of the institute took place in London, February 25, 1869. There were two general meetings each year, one in May, in London, and one in autumn in other cities, not always in Great Britain, for the institute has met in Paris, Vienna, Brussels, Düsseldorf and New York. Beginning in 1874 it annually presented the Bessemer Gold Medal, for some invention or notable paper.

The institute published the semi-annual Journal of the Iron and Steel Institute, containing original papers and abstracts from other publications.

In 1974, the Iron and Steel Institute merged into the Institute of Metals. The Institute of Metals then merged in 1993 with the Institute of Ceramics and the Plastics and Rubber Institute to form the Institute of Materials (IoM). The IoM and the Institution of Mining and Metallurgy merged in June 2002, becoming the Institute of Materials, Minerals and Mining.

Presidents
Presidents of the institute were: 
1869-71 William Cavendish, 7th Duke of Devonshire
1871-73 Sir Henry Bessemer
1873-75 Sir Lowthian Bell Bt FRS
1875-77 William Menelaus
1877-79 Sir C William Siemens FRS
1879-81 Edward Williams
1881-83 Josiah Timmis Smith
1883-85 Rt Hon Sir Bernard Samuelson Bt FRS
1885-87 John Percy MD FRS
1887-89 Daniel Adamson
1889-91 The Rt Hon Lord Airedale of Gledhow DSc
1891-93 Sir Frederick Augustus Abel Bt GVCO KCB FRS
1893-95 Edward Windsor Richards
1895-97 Sir David Dale Bt DCL
1897-99 Edward Pritchard Martin
1899-1901 Sir William Chandler Roberts-Austen KCB DCL FRS
1901-03 William Whitwell 
1903-05 Andrew Carnegie LLD
1905-07 Sir Robert Abbott Hadfield Bt DSc FRS
1907-10 Sir Hugh Bell Bt CD DCL LLD
1910-12 Victor Cavendish, 9th Duke of Devonshire KG
1912-14 Arthur Cooper LLD
1914-15 Adolphe Greiner DSc
1916-18 Rt Hon Lord Invernairn of Strathnairn
1918-20 C P Eugene Schneider DSc
1920-22 John Edward Stead DSc DMet FRS
1922-24 Francis Samuelson
1924-25 Sir William Ellis GBE DENG
1925-26 Sir Frederick Mills Bt DL
1926-27 Sir W Peter Rylands JP
1927-28 Frank William Harbord CBE
1928-29 Benjamin Talbot
1929-31 Henry Louis MA DSc
1931-33 Col Sir W Charles Wright Bt KBE CB
1933-35 William R Lysaght CBE
1935-37 Sir Harold Carpenter FRS
1937-38 Alfred Hutchinson MA
1938-40 The Rt Hon The Earl of Dudley DC
1940-42 Sir John Craig CBE DL
1942-44 James Henderson
1944-46 Arthur Dorman
1946-48 Dr Cecil Henry Desch DSc PhD LLD FRS
1948-50 Sir Andrew McCance LLD DSc FRS
1950-51 James Robert Menzies-Wilson OBE
1951-52 Richard Mather BMet
1952-53 Captain Hector Leighton Davies CBE JP
1953-54 James Mitchell CBE
1954-55 The Hon Richard Glynne Lyttelton
1955-56 Sir Charles Bruce-Gardner Bt
1956-57 Herbert Henry Burton CBE DMet
1957-58 Arnold Hugo Ingen-Housz
1958-59 Charles Reginald Wheeler CBE
1959-60 William Barr OBE
1960-61 William Frederick Cartwright DL
1961-62 Sir Charles Goodeve OBE DSc FRS
1962-63 Maurice Alberic Fiennes
1963-64 Frank Bernard George
1964-65 Frank Henry Saniter OBE DSc (Tech) BENG
1965-66 William Frederick Gilbertson
1966-67 Sir Douglas Bruce-Gardner Bt
1967-68 Norman E Jones CMG DSc ASTC
1968-69 Dr John Hugh Chesters OBE FRS
1969-70 Niall Campbell Macdiarmid
1970-71 Norman Cecil Lake CBE
1971-72 Thomas Rae Craig CBE TD
1972-73 Geoffrey Thomas Harris CBE
1973-74 Lionel Roger Price Pugh CRD DL

See also
 Institute of Materials, Minerals and Mining

References

 

1869 establishments in the United Kingdom
Redirects with possibilities
Defunct learned societies of the United Kingdom